Rosemarie Greco began her career in the financial services industry as a bank-branch secretary; rising to be one of the highest-ranking woman in banking in the United States. She currently is co-chairwoman of VISION 2020, a national initiative for women's economic and social equality that works with affiliated organizations to advance issues important to women.

Education 
Greco is a magna cum laude graduate of St. Joseph's University and has received Honorary Degrees from Temple, Cabrini, Albright and Thomas Jefferson Universities.

Early life 
Prior to entering the financial services industry, Greco was a schoolteacher in Philadelphia's Catholic schools.

For four years, Greco served as a member of the Board of Education for the School District of Philadelphia.

Greco chaired the board of trustees of the Philadelphia Award, served on the board of directors of the Franklin Institute and as a trustee for her alma mater. Greco also served as chair of the Greater Philadelphia Chamber of Commerce, one of the largest business Chambers in the U.S. During her tenure, the Paradigm Award, the Region's most prestigious award given annually to a woman business and civic leader, was awarded to her.

During the past dozen years, she has held director, trustee and committee chair positions for a total of nine public and privately held corporations in various business sectors, most recently Sunoco, Inc and the Pennsylvania Real Estate Investment Trust.

Career

CoreStates 
She was the chief executive officer and president of CoreStates Bank, N.A. and president of its parent corporation, CoreStates Financial Corp. During her tenure the bank, ranked as the eighteenth largest in the United States at the time, was recognized as one of America's most profitable and efficient banks.  CoreStates was also heralded for its corporate philanthropy, service quality, and its culture of employee empowerment and diversity.

Fidelity Bank and First Fidelity Bancorporation 
Greco served as president and chief executive officer of Fidelity Bank and as senior executive vice president, chief retail officer and director of First Fidelity Bancorporation.

Health care reform 
Greco is also known as a civic and community leader, eventually adding public service to her commitments.  For six years, she served as a member of Governor Edward G. Rendell's Administration, in the cabinet-level position of executive director of the Governor's Office of Health Care Reform.

She became regarded in the Health Care Policy arena for her proposals, including: the codification and expansion of scope-of-practice parameters for nurses and non-physician health care professionals; an agreement with the State's Blue Cross/Blue Shield plans which resulted in the contribution of several hundred million new dollars to provide health insurance for uninsured, low- wage working people; the country's first comprehensive law requiring health-care-acquired infection reporting from hospitals and nursing homes.; and for arousing the statewide initiatives of the  Chronic Care Commission.

She currently works on providing Quality and affordable healthcare in Pennsylvania.

Corporate and non-corporate positions 

Greco is currently a director of Exelon Corporation, chair of its compensation committee and a member of its Executive, Governance and Energy Delivery committees.  She also serves as a director of the board of PECO  Energy, a subsidiary of Exelon Corporation. Greco is also a Trustee of SEI MUTUAL FUNDS and is chair of its Governance Committee, and is a director of the Pennsylvania Real Estate Investment Trust and chairs its Nominating and Governance Committee. She is also a director emeritus of the board of directors of the Philadelphia Orchestra.

Her current non-corporate positions include chair of the board of overseers of the School of Nursing, University of Pennsylvania, a founding advisory board member of ASAP, an award-winning after-school activity program for inner-city youth, and co-chair of VISION 2020, a campaign to make equality a national priority through shared leadership among women and men.

She has served the City of Philadelphia as chair of the first Women's Commission, as a member of the City Planning Commission, as chair of a task force, which drew the charter for Mayor Rendell's Office for Management, Productivity and Planning, and as a member of the executive committee of the founding board of Philadelphia's Special Service District. Greco also served the Commonwealth of Pennsylvania as a member of the Casey Philadelphia Special Judiciary Nominating Panel, the Advisory Commission for the Department of Banking, as a member of Pennsylvania 2000, a statewide coalition for education reform, and as a member of the Foundation for a Drug Free Pennsylvania.

She founded and chaired the School-to-Career Leadership Council, personally recruiting and engaging chief executive officer colleagues of the city's major corporations to assume leadership responsibility for the Philadelphia School District's Community Resource Boards. She has served on the executive committee of the Business Public School Partnership for Reform and as chairman of the Philadelphia Youth Network.  She founded and co-chaired the Campaign for Human Capital for the School District of Philadelphia, its goal is to hire  and keep the jobs of certified teachers for the city's schools and students.

She served as interim president and CEO of the Philadelphia Private Industry Council, affecting the agency's turnaround and establishing the infrastructure for implementing Pennsylvania and Philadelphia's Welfare to Work Program.

She served as chair of the Philadelphia Compact, a joint venture between the Pew Foundation and the Annenberg Center for Public Policy, which led the public effort to ensure the issue-based focus of the 1999 mayoral race.

Five years after having courted the Women's NCAA to bring the Final Four to Philadelphia, Greco served as co-chair of Philadelphia's sponsoring organization for the event.  Under her leadership, this national event, for the first time, generated a significant surplus, which was designated for continuing support of girls’ athletics.

Awards 
She is the recipient of several awards, including appointment as the "Distinguished Daughter of Pennsylvania", "Lucretia Mott Women's Way Award", The "John Wanamaker Award", and the U.S. Marine Corp's "Semper Fidelis Award."

Publications 
Greco's career, management style and business accomplishments have been documented and reviewed in major publications and in books on leadership, sales and financial management.  She has also authored articles which have appeared in financial and business publications, including the Harvard Business Review.

References

Living people
Pennsylvania Democrats
State cabinet secretaries of Pennsylvania
Saint Joseph's University alumni
Year of birth missing (living people)